Maungmagan is a village and beach located approximately  north-west of Dawei, the capital of Taninthayi Division. It is the second oldest beach locale established in Myanmar after Ngapali.

Development
Maungmagan is an approximately 25-minute drive away from Dawei and 75 minute flight from Yangon, the principal city of Myanmar. It was a popular beach destination in Myanmar until the establishment of Chaungtha which was much more closer to Yangon. The beach is being redeveloped by the Burmese government due to its proximity to Bangkok's tourist market through the newly opened (Aug 2013) Phu Nam Ron border gate. It is intended that Maungmagan and its neighbouring beaches of San Maria Bay and Nabule will become stop overs for the much promoted ecotourism to the Myeik Archipelago

References

Beaches of Myanmar
Tourist attractions in Myanmar
Populated places in Tanintharyi Region